Lampropeltis triangulum andesiana, commonly known as the Andean milksnake, is an alpine subspecies of milk snake.

Description
These colorful snakes are covered in stripes of red, black, and yellow, often with black speckles on each scale.

Geographic range
Milk snakes range throughout the Americas, from Canada south to Ecuador.  The Andean subspecies of milk snake occurs in the Andes mountains of Colombia and Venezuela.

Habitat

Behavior
As mountain dwellers, Andean milk snakes can tolerate much lower temperatures than most snakes.  They spend much of the time in burrows or under logs, where they are safe from predators and from cold weather.  Milk snakes often come out of their dens in the afternoon or evening to hunt.

Life history

Females may lay up to four clutches of eggs per year, with 12 - 20 eggs per clutch.  Hatchlings are 8 - 10 inches long, but reach an adult length of 38 to 70 inches.   The captive lifespan can be more than 15 years.

Diet

Like all snakes, Andean milk snakes are carnivores.  Young milk snakes mostly eat insects, while larger milk snakes eat small mammals, birds, eggs, amphibians, and other reptiles, including venomous snakes.  Like most snakes, milk snakes only need to eat once every one or two weeks.

Coral snake mimics

Unlike most nonvenomous snakes, which are mottled gray and brown for camouflage, Andean milk snakes are brilliantly colored (although adults are often duller than juveniles, having an almost dusky appearance) in red, yellow, and black. The white and red scales are frequently clearly tipped with black. It has white scales on its snout with black sutures and often a large amount of white on the cheeks. It has 24 to 32 red rings which may be broken up with black in the mid-dorsal section and the rings may not completely cross the venter.  These bright colors are similar to those of the coral snake, a venomous elapid (which includes cobras and mambas) that lives in the same areas as the milk snakes.  Andean milk snakes use this bright coloration to fool potential predators into believing that they are also venomous, and too risky to eat.

There are several rhymes to help people remember the color difference between harmless milk snakes and the poisonous coral snake.  Two rhymes that describe the stripe pattern of these snakes are:

"Black 'round yellow, harmless fellow.  Yellow 'round black, stay far back."

"Red touches black, you're O.K. Jack.  Red touches yellow, you're a dead fellow."

Conservation status

Not listed on CITES or the IUCN Red List of Threatened and Endangered Species.  Little is known about the wild population of Andean milk snakes, but they are thought to be common.  These docile, colorful snakes are widely bred in captivity for the pet trade.

References

Further reading
Caribbean Journal of Science.  (2003) 39(2):235-236.
M O'Shea and T Halliday.  2002.  Reptiles and Amphibians.  Doring Kindersley, Inc.
Andean Milksnake Caresheet, Kingsnake.com

Lampropeltis
Snakes of South America
Fauna of the Andes
Reptiles of Colombia
Reptiles of Venezuela
Taxa named by Kenneth L. Williams